Melese pusilla is a moth of the family Erebidae. It was described by Walter Rothschild in 1909. It is found in French Guiana, Suriname, Guyana and Brazil.

References

 

Melese
Moths described in 1909